Scott Stauch (born January 3, 1959) is a former professional American football player who played running back for one season for the New Orleans Saints.

References

1959 births
Living people
American football running backs
New Orleans Saints players
UCLA Bruins football players
Players of American football from Seattle